Narasaraopeta Engineering College is an engineering college for higher education in India, located in Narasaraopeta, Guntur District, Andhra Pradesh, India. Established in 1998, NEC is an Autonomous Institution with permanent affiliation to JNTUK, Kakinada and is promoted and backed by Gayatri Educational Development Society (GEDS).

The institution is approved by the All India Council for Technical Education, New Delhi, and has been accredited by the National Board of Accreditation and National Assessment and Accreditation Council with ‘A+’ Grade. The college is certified with ISO 9001:2008 and got featured in NIRF top 300 Ranking in 2022.

History 

Narasaraopeta Engineering College known as NEC was established in 1998 by Gayatri Educational Development Society (GEDS) by Mr. Mittapalli Venkata Koteswara Rao, who is an influential philanthropist and industrialist in Guntur District. NEC was the first technical education institution in the Palnadu Region of Guntur district, Andhra Pradesh.
In the last two decades, the institute has produced prominent engineers, bureaucrats, and leaders in the region. It has been the centre for innovation, research, and entrepreneurship.

At present, the college is run by a group of educationalists, technologists and industrialists. Mr. M.V.Koteswara Rao acts as the chairman of the college managing committee. Mr. Chakravarthi Mittapalli is the Vice Chairman and Director of NEC Group of Institutions, who looks after the transformations in engineering, technical and professional education. Mr. Chakravarthi has been acting as the key person behind the industry-institute collaboration. It is under his leadership that NEC has been selected for setting up Indo-European Skilling centres for Mechatronics and Industrial Robotics - in collaboration with APSSDC & Applied Robot Control, Germany.

Campus

Narasaraopeta Engineering College campus spreads across 48 acres of land. It is 100 km away from Gannavaram airport.
The campus consists of a central library, Hi-tech classrooms with digital projectors enabled to facilitate the students with E-learning, wifi-enabled computer labs, workshops-mechanical, civil, electrical.

Hostels are available for students (Air Conditioned A.C & Non-A.C) and faculties along with a guest house, canteens, medical centre, indoor stadiums.
The campus has a good cricket pitch of the central strip of the cricket field between the wickets. It is 22 yd (20.12 m) long (1 chain) and 10 ft (3.05 m) wide. The surface is flat and normally covered with extremely short grass. The campus also contains a good playground for athletics and various sports.

Departments

NEC has 13 independent departments- Mechanical Engineering, Civil, Engineering, Computer Science and Engineering, Electronics 
and Communication Engineering, CSE in AI, CSE in AI & ML, CSE in Cyber Security, CSE in Data Science, Electrical and Electronics Engineering, Information Technology, Master of Business Administration, Master of Computer Applications, and Basic Sciences & Humanities. Each department has their individual blocks,  Head of Departments and facilities.

Courses

Undergraduate Programmes

 B.Tech. – Mechanical Engineering
 B.Tech. – Civil Engineering
 B.Tech. – Computer Science and Engineering
 B.Tech. – Electronics and Communication Engineering
 B.Tech. – Electrical and Electronics Engineering
 B.Tech. - Information Technology
 B.Tech. - Computer Science and Engineering (AI)
 B.Tech. - Computer Science and Engineering (AI & ML)
 B.Tech. - Computer Science and Engineering (Data Science)
 B.Tech. - Computer Science and Engineering (Cyber Security)

Post-graduate programs

 M.Tech. – Computer Science and Engineering    
 M.Tech. – Digital Systems and Computer Electronics    
 M.Tech. – Digital Electronics and Communication Systems    
 M.Tech. – Power and Industrial Drives    
 M.Tech. – Thermal Engineering    
 M.Tech. – Machine Design   
 M.Tech. – Structural Engineering   
 Master of Business Administration
 Master of Computer Applications

Admissions

Admission to the Undergraduate programmes

B.Tech

NEC offers seats based on student's performance in the Common Entrance Test (EAMCET) conducted by the government Andhra Pradesh. However, only 70% of the seats allotted are based on merit in EAMCET while 30% of the seats are marked as Management Quota.

Admission to the postgraduate programmes

M.Tech.

70% of the admissions are done on the basis of GATE /PGECET ranks while
30% admissions are management based.

MBA and MCA

70% of the admissions done on the basis of APICET ranks while
30% of admissions are management based.

Student life

NEC organises technical and cultural fest every year. The college consists of various student clubs like Photography, Shortfilms, Sports, and Cultural.

Sports events (indoor & outdoors) and cultural activities such as dancing, singing and drama  takes place in the college from time to time
Freshers and farewell parties are conducted for both students and faculty separately.

Students run a college radio station where interested students and teachers can participate.

NEC welcomes guest lectures and conducts workshops for student and faculty welfare.

NEC has a National Service Scheme unit- It undertakes activities like plantation programme, rallies for awareness of various diseases like HIV and cancer.

Anti-ragging team is very active in the college.

Industry partners

NEC is a Microsoft Edvantage Platinum Partner and hosts Microsoft Innovation Centre on campus and has a Robotics & Embedded Systems Center.

Often listed as one of the top 10 B.Tech. colleges in Andhra Pradesh, NEC has also received TCS accreditation and is an Infosys – Campus Connect College.

New Mexico State University (NMSU), a flagship research university in Las Cruces, New Mexico, United States signed an MOU with NEC in 2018. As part of the Skill Development exchange program, students of NEC can study in NMSU and can use their research and development cells to learn about advancements in Science and Technology.

Achievements

 Part of Stanford University Innovation Fellowship Programme   
 Recognized AP CM's Skill Excellence Centre  
 Artificial Intelligence Centre of Excellence and Deep Learning in association with BENNETT University, New Delhi.    
 Recognized by MSME Business Incubator/Host Institution    2018
 Venture Development Centre in association with i2E North Eastern University and APSSDC    
 Member ICT Academy    
 Recognized Remote Centre by NMEICT – IIT Bombay   
 Indo European Skilling centres for Mechatronics and Industrial Robotics- in collaboration with APSSDC & Applied Robot Control), Germany
 The first engineering college in the State of Andhra Pradesh recognized & approved as "Pollution Testing Center" by RTA.

References

 https://www.nrtec.in/achievements-accolades/
 https://www.nrtec.in/german-delegates-visit-narasaraopeta-engineering-college/
 http://www.newindianexpress.com/states/andhra-pradesh/2018/nov/25/40-narasaraopeta-engineering-college-students-get-campus-placement-1902971.html
 https://www.nrtec.in/events/mou-signed-between-nmsu-and-nrtec
 https://www.newindianexpress.com/states/andhra-pradesh/2022/aug/04/nec-features-in-nirf-top-300-ranking-2483907.html

Engineering colleges in Andhra Pradesh
Universities and colleges in Guntur district
Educational institutions established in 1998
1998 establishments in Andhra Pradesh